There are a significant number of Filipinos in China consisting of migrants and expatriates from the Philippines to the People's Republic of China.

Employment
Many domestic workers from the Philippines have been coming to China to work as maids. Figures from the Philippines government in 2009 shows that mainland China has become the top destination for Filipino maids seeking work overseas as Chinese families are willing to employ them for better household services and for their fluency in the English language.

Distribution

Hong Kong

There are around 140,000 Filipinos in Hong Kong, many of whom work as foreign domestic helpers.

Mainland China

Based on records from the Philippine Department of Foreign Affairs, there were about 12,254 overseas Filipinos in mainland China. Most of them live in cities such as Beijing (2,492), Chongqing (164), Guangzhou (4,564), Shanghai (4,264) and Xiamen (7,707).

See also
China–Philippines relations
Chinese Filipino

References

Ethnic groups in China
China
China–Philippines relations